American Piano Company (Ampico) was an American piano manufacturer formed in 1908 through the merger of Wm. Knabe & Co., Chickering & Sons, and Foster-Armstrong. They later purchased the Mason & Hamlin piano company as their flagship piano. The merger created one of the largest American piano manufacturers. In 1932, it was merged with the Aeolian Company to form Aeolian-American Co.

Reproducing pianos
From 1914, American Piano was one of the leading producers of player pianos, most notably their reproducing player known as the Ampico. The Ampico reproducing player piano was able to capture all the expression of the original performance, with dynamics and fine nuances other devices could not  reproduce.  Their main competitors in reproducing players were the Aeolian Duo-Art (1913) and Welte-Mignon (1905). The player piano and reproducing Ampico mechanism was originally designed by Charles Fuller Stoddard (1876–1958) with Dr. Clarence Hickman joining the company in the mid-1920s. 

Distinguished classical and popular pianists such as Sergei Rachmaninoff (1873–1943), Leo Ornstein (1892–2002), Ferde Grofé (1892-1972), Winifred MacBride, Marguerite Melville Liszniewska, and Marguerite Volavy (1886–1951), Adam Carroll, Frank Milne, and others recorded for Ampico, and their rolls are a legacy of 19th and early 20th century aesthetic and musical practice. 

By the end of 1932, Ampico suffered economic difficulties and was finally merged with the Aeolian Company, manufacturer of player pianos and organs. The combined company, known as Aeolian-American Corp., went through several ownership changes before declaring bankruptcy in 1985.

The Ampico reproducing player piano system was discontinued in 1941. The last model introduced was the Ampico Spinet Reproducing Piano, which had all the functionality of a reproducing piano, and although having a low cost of $495, had modest sales.

The first piano rolls specially coded for the Ampico were made by Rythmodik Music Corporation.

History 
Originally named Despatch after the transportation company that spawned several dozen car shops in the area, the village of East Rochester was also home to a musical manufacturing giant for the better part of the 20th century. Nestled in between the New York Central Railroad tracks and Commercial Street, the 250,000 square-foot edifice designed by Henry Ives was the first industrial building in the United States to be constructed from reinforced concrete.

Renowned for its fine craftsmanship, the American Piano Company was the largest distributor and manufacturer of pianos in the world by the mid-1920s. The instrument's popularity reached its peak that decade thanks to a growth in prosperity and an increased interest in music stimulated by phonographs and radio. Piano producers across the country would not fare as well the following decade.   Over 347,000 pianos were purchased in the United States in 1923, .

Legacy
Ampico reproducing pianos, and their associated piano rolls were rediscovered by collectors in the 1960s who formed the Automatic Musical Instruments Collector's Association.

References

General references
 Larry Givens: Re-enacting the Artist: A Story of the Ampico Reproducing Piano,  Vestal, N.Y.: Vestal Press, 1970.
 Elaine Obenchain: The Complete Catalog of Ampico Reproducing Piano Rolls, New York: American Piano Co., 1977 
 History of Ampico, by The Pianola Institute, London, Accessed April 1, 2009

Piano manufacturing companies of the United States
Mechanical musical instruments
Defunct manufacturing companies based in New York (state)